The 2010–11 English Hockey League season took place from September 2010 until April 2011. The Men's Championship was won by Beeston and the Women's Championship was won by Reading.

The Men's Cup was won by Beeston and the Women's Cup was won by Leicester.

Men's Premier Division League Standings

Results

Play Offs

Women's Premier Division League Standings

Play Offs

Men's Cup

Quarter-finals

Semi-finals

Final 
(Held at the Cannock on 14 May)

Women's Cup

Quarter-finals

Semi-finals

Final 
(Held at Cannock on 14 May)

References 

England Hockey League seasons
field hockey
field hockey
England